Castaways and Cutouts is the first full-length album by The Decemberists, originally released on May 21, 2002, on Hush Records and reissued on May 6, 2003, on Kill Rock Stars. The album's title is taken from a lyric of the song "California One/Youth and Beauty Brigade".

The album cover was designed by the Portland artist Carson Ellis, the long-time girlfriend (now wife) of frontman Colin Meloy. She has created artwork for each of the band's albums.

Reception 

Castaways and Cutouts received mostly positive reviews. The album ranked number 89 on Under the Radar's Top 200 Albums of the 2000s and number 96 on Pitchforks The 100 Best Albums of 2000–2004.

Track listing
All songs written by Colin Meloy.

Personnel
According to the liner notes of Castaways and Cutouts.

Colin Meloy – vocals, guitar, percussion
Chris Funk – guitar, pedal steel, theremin 
Jenny Conlee – Hammond organ, piano, Rhodes piano, accordion
Nate Query – upright bass
Ezra Holbrook – drums, percussion, vocals

Production
Produced by The Decemberists
Recorded by Simon Widdowson
Mastered by Ryan Foster
Design by Third Eyebrow (.com)
Art direction by Colin Meloy and Carson Ellis
Cover painting and illustrations by Carson Ellis
Inner-tray photo by Jonathan Gitelson
Sound clip in "California One/Youth and Beauty Brigade" from Archangel, directed by Guy Maddin.

References

The Decemberists albums
2002 debut albums
Hush Records albums